Robert "Bob" Wood (14 November 1872 – 1 March 1928) was an English rugby union, and professional rugby league footballer who played in the 1890s. Prior to Thursday 29 August 1895, Liversedge, and Wakefield Trinity were both rugby union clubs.

Background
Bob Wood was born in Pontefract, West Riding of Yorkshire, England, and he died aged 55 in Knottingley, West Riding of Yorkshire, England.

Playing career

International honours
Bob Wood won a cap for England (RU) while at Liversedge in the 1894 Home Nations Championship against Ireland.

County honours
Bob Wood won caps for Yorkshire (RL) while at Wakefield Trinity.

Change of Code
When Liversedge converted from the rugby union code to the rugby league code on Thursday 29 August 1895, Bob Wood would have been 22 years of age. However, by this time he had transferred to Wakefield Trinity, and so he could not have been both a rugby union, and rugby league footballer for Liversedge.

Club career
Bob Wood played , i.e. number 2, in Wakefield Trinity's first ever match in the Northern Union (now the Rugby Football League), the 0-11 defeat by Bradford FC during the inaugural 1895–96 season at Park Avenue, Bradford on Saturday 7 September 1895.

References

1872 births
1928 deaths
England international rugby union players
English rugby league players
English rugby union players
Liversedge RFC players
Sportspeople from Knottingley
Rugby league five-eighths
Rugby league halfbacks
Rugby league players from Pontefract
Rugby league wingers
Rugby union halfbacks
Rugby union players from Pontefract
Wakefield Trinity players
Yorkshire rugby league team players